Moneyneany or Moneyneena (and) is a small village and townland in County Londonderry, Northern Ireland. In the 2001 Census it had a population of 162. It is situated within Mid-Ulster District.

People
Tony Scullion, Gaelic Football and Hurling player for Ballinascreen and Derry, and receiver of four football GAA All Stars Awards, was born in Moneyneena.
Colonel Brian O'Neill, one of three sons of Owen Roe O'Neill who returned to Ireland with him after serving under him on the continent in 1641, was resident at Moydamlaght in the 1663 Hearth Money Rolls.

References 

Villages in County Londonderry
Townlands of County Londonderry
Mid-Ulster District